Samuel Wieland (born 25 July 1977 in Melbourne) is an Australian sport shooter. He tied for 22nd place in the men's 50 metre rifle three positions event at the 2000 Summer Olympics.

References

1977 births
Living people
ISSF rifle shooters
Australian male sport shooters
Olympic shooters of Australia
Shooters at the 2000 Summer Olympics
Commonwealth Games medallists in shooting
Commonwealth Games gold medallists for Australia
Commonwealth Games bronze medallists for Australia
Shooters at the 2002 Commonwealth Games
Sportspeople from Melbourne
Sportsmen from Victoria (Australia)
Medallists at the 2002 Commonwealth Games